Deena Mohamed (Arabic: دينا محمد‎, born ca. 1995) is an Egyptian graphic designer, graphic novelist, and illustrator, who was born and raised in Egypt. She made her debut at the age of 18 with her webcomic Qahera, combining both Islamic and feminist values. Mohamed has collaborated with various advocacy groups, such as Harassmap and Centre for Applied Human Rights, to create informational comics.

In a cartoon for the online literary magazine ArabLit.org, she described her experience of creating her work in English, addressing international readers, as opposed to using Arabic for an Egyptian and Arab public. Even though she considers both of these forms of expression as part of her personality, she sometimes uses different issues, like feminism in Arabic and Islamophobia in English.

Written works

Shubeik Lubeik 
Shubeik Lubeik is Mohamed's bilingual trilogy, first published in 2015. It follows the protagonist, Aziza, on her journey in an imagined modern day Egypt. In this world wishes are sold in bottles at the Egyptian markets. Aziza is against purchasing wishes, however her views change when her childhood friend, Abdo, disappears. The graphic novel was originally published in Arabic and later translated into English and other languages. As of 2021 Mohamed is working on the final installment in the trilogy, set to release in 2022.

Qahera 
Qahera is Mohamed's first webcomic, first published in 2013, at the age of 18, and is currently still ongoing. Originally published in English, then also in Arabic, the webcomic follows a nameless Egyptian female superhero on the lookout for social issues faced by women in the Arab world. She has criticized sexual harassment, corrupt police, retrograd clerics, and Western feminism.

The series, which began as a joke amongst friends but soon became a viral phenomenon, had nearly 500,000 unique visitors, with an average of 10,000 hits per day between September and November 2013.

Visual works

Harassmap Consent Campaign 
A 2018 social media campaign that includes a series of short comics, in collaboration with Harassmap, about consent. Each comic strip discusses consent in various contexts. The lead for this project was Rebecca Chiao, the co-founder of Harassmap, a project aimed to bring awareness to sexual violence in Egypt.

Center for Applied Human Rights Comics 
A series of comic strips, illustrated by Mohamed, in which each depicts the response, from human rights defenders, to "What factors make you feel secure and insecure?". This project was in collaboration with The Centre for Applied Human Rights at the University of York and was led by Dr. Alice Nah.

Google Doodle 
In January 2020 Deena Mohamed was commissioned by Google to make Mufidah Abdul Rahman's 106th Birthday Doodle.

Awards 
Best Graphic Novel and the Grand Prize at Cairo Comix Festival in 2017, for her first installment in Shubeik Lubeik. In 2019 Mohamed received a McDowell fellowship for literature.

Publications
Mohamed, Deena (2017). Shubeik Lubeik 1. Maamoul Press.
Mohamed, Deena (2018). Shubeik Lubeik 2. Maamoul Press.

References

External links
 
Qahera Comic

Living people
21st-century Egyptian women artists
Egyptian comics artists
1995 births
Arabic comics artists